Government Naming Committee (sometimes referred as National Naming Committee or Government Names Committee) is a public committee appointed by the Government of Israel, which deals with the designation of names for communities and other points on the map of Israel, and the replacement of Arabic names that existed until 1948 with Hebrew names. The committee's decisions bind state institutions.

In the naming process, the committee relies on historical names, the translation of Arabic names, and giving a Hebrew form to Arabic names.

See also
 Hebraization of Palestinian place names

References

External links

Government agencies of Israel
Hebrew language
Geographical naming agencies
Geography of Israel